Exertional hemoglobinuria (or exercise hematuria) may refer to:
March hemoglobinuria caused by impacts upon the body
Hemoglobinuria secondary to athletic nephritis